The National Commission for Communication and Liberties (Commission nationale de la communication et des libertés or CNCL) was a TV and radio regulatory body set up in France in 1986 as the successor to the Haute Autorité de la communication audiovisuelle, and dissolved in 1989 to be followed by the Conseil supérieur de l'audiovisuel.

History of telecommunications in France
Radio in France
Television in France
Government agencies established in 1986
1989 disestablishments
1986 establishments in France
Government agencies of France